Miyuki Uehara (born November 22, 1995) is a Japanese female long-distance runner who competes in the 5000 metres and 10,000 metres.

Born in Kagoshima, she attended high school there and after graduation became a professional corporate runner with Dai-ichi Life. She made her first progress at senior national level in 2015, coming seventh at the Japanese National Games, then took fifth over 5000 m at the 2016 Japan Championships in Athletics.

As a junior athlete, she made her breakthrough at the Asian Cross Country Championships, leading the Japanese in the individual and team events for two junior gold medals. Later that year, she placed eighth on the track in the 3000 metres at the 2012 World Junior Championships in Athletics. She was on Japan's fourth-placed junior team at the 2013 IAAF World Cross Country Championships. In 2015, she improved her track bests to 15:21.40 minutes for the 5000 m and 32:16.66 minutes for the 10,000 m.

Under the guidance of coach Sachiko Yamashita (a former world medallist in the marathon), she gained selection for Japan at the 2016 Summer Olympics and, after front-running her heat, she made it to the Olympic 5000 m final – only the second Japanese woman to achieve that feat.

International competitions

References

External links

Living people
1995 births
People from Kagoshima
Sportspeople from Kagoshima Prefecture
Japanese female long-distance runners
Olympic athletes of Japan
Athletes (track and field) at the 2016 Summer Olympics
Dai-ichi Life
Japanese female cross country runners
20th-century Japanese women
21st-century Japanese women